The Chartreuse Mountains are a mountain range in southeastern France, stretching from the city of Grenoble in the south to the Lac du Bourget in the north. They are part of the French Prealps, which continue as the Bauges to the north and the Vercors to the south.

Etymology
The name Chartreuse is derived from the village now known as Saint-Pierre-de-Chartreuse, earlier Catorissium, Cantourisa, Caturissium, and Chatrousse. It appears to be of Gaulish origin; and is perhaps related to the name of the Caturiges tribe.

Geography
The mountain range rises between Grenoble (south), Chambéry (north), Voiron and Saint-Laurent-du-Pont (west) and Grésivaudan (Isère valley, east)

Main summits
Summits of the Chartreuse Mountains include:
Chamechaude, 
Dent de Crolles, 
Les Lances de Malissard 
Grand Som, 
Dôme de Bellefont 
Piton de Bellefont 
Mont Granier, 
La Grande Sure, 
Le Charmant Som 
Sommet du Pinet ou le Truc 
Rochers de Chalves  
Rocher de Lorzier  
Dent de l'Ours  
Scia 
Petit Som  
Pinéa  
Mont Outheran  
Grands Crêts 
Pointe de la Gorgeat 
Écoutoux  
mont Saint-Eynard 
Néron 
Rachais

Main passes
Passes of the Chartreuse Mountains include :

With road
Col de la Charmette 
Col de la Cluse 
Col du Coq
Col du Cucheron 
Col du Granier 
Col de Porte 
Col de Palaquit 
Col de Vence 
Col de la Placette

Without road
Col de l'Alpe 
Col de l'Alpette 
Col des Ayes 
Col de Charmille
Col des Émeindras 
Col de la Faîta 
Col de Bellefond 
Col de Léchaud 
Col de la Ruchère 
Col de la Sure
Col de la Grande Vache
Col de la Petite Vache
Col du Baure

Main canyons 
Canyons of the Chartreuse Mountains include :
 Gorges du Guiers Vif
 Gorges du Guiers Mort
 Gorges du Ténaison
 Gorges de la Vence
 Gorge du Manival
 Gorges de l'Echaillon
 Gorges du Cozon Rau

Main plateaux 
Plateaux of the Chartreuse Mountains include :
 Plateau des Petites Roches
 Plateau du Grand-Ratz

Main Caves 
The main caves in the Chartreuse include :

Geology
The lithology is dominated by limestone, and several hundred kilometres of cave passages lie beneath the hills, including the world-famous 60 km long Dent de Crolles system.

Winter sports resorts
Chartreuse winter sports resorts include :
 Le Désert d'Entremont, where the use of snowshoes has been particularly developed
 Granier en Chartreuse
 Saint-Pierre-de-Chartreuse and Le Planolet
 Saint-Hugues-de-Chartreuse
 Col de Porte 
 Le Sappey-en-Chartreuse
 La Ruchère (cross-country skiing)
 Saint-Hilaire-du-Touvet
 Col de Marcieu
 Col du Coq

Environment
 The Parc Naturel Régional de la Chartreuse was founded in May 1995.
 The Réserve Naturelle des Hauts de Chartreuse was founded in 1997. It includes seven Isère townships and four Savoie townships.

Miscellaneous
The Chartreuse Mountains gave their name to the monastery of the Grande Chartreuse, the monastic Carthusian Order takes its name from these mountains, where its first hermitage was founded in 1084. 
Also derived from the mountain range's name is that of the alcoholic cordial Chartreuse produced by the monks since the 1740s, and of the chartreuse colour, greenish hue of the Chartreuse liqueur, named after the drink.

References

See also 

 Néron (Isère)

External links

Chartreuse: A Walking Guide
A Wiki-Walks guide to some less well known hiking routes in the Chartreuse

 
Mountain ranges of the Alps
Mountain ranges of Auvergne-Rhône-Alpes
Mountains of Isère
Mountains of Savoie